or Torazō Miyazaki (1 January 1871 – 6 December 1922) was a Japanese philosopher who aided and supported Sun Yat-sen during the Xinhai Revolution. While Sun was in Japan, he assisted Sun in his travels as he was wanted by Qing dynasty authorities.

Biography
This name would later be converted to the more popular Chinese name Sun Zhongshan (孫中山). 
On 7 September 1900, Sun's first overseas visit to Singapore was to rescue Miyazaki Toten who was arrested there. This act resulted in his own arrest and a ban from visiting the island for five years.

The Nanjing Historical Remains Museum of Chinese Modern History has bronze statues of Sun and Miyazaki placed alongside each other.

See also

 Names of Sun Yat-sen

References

External links 
 

Japanese philosophers
Japanese revolutionaries
1871 births
1922 deaths
People from Kumamoto
Sun Yat-sen